Miguel Ángel García (born 28 September 1960) is a Spanish wrestler. He represented Spain at the Wrestling at the 1984 Summer Olympics – Men's freestyle 57 kg.

References

External links
 

Living people
Olympic wrestlers of Spain
Wrestlers at the 1984 Summer Olympics
Spanish male sport wrestlers
1960 births
20th-century Spanish people